Andrija Kaluđerović (born 5 July 1987) is a Serbian professional footballer who plays as a striker for OFK Beograd.

Club career
On 13 December 2003, aged 16, Kaluđerović made his senior debut for OFK Beograd under manager Stevica Kuzmanovski, coming on as an injury-time substitute for Hristijan Kirovski in a 1–1 away league draw against Budućnost Banatski Dvor. He spent the majority of the following three seasons on loan to various clubs, most notably Spartak Subotica in the Serbian First League. In the 2009 winter transfer window, Kaluđerović moved from OFK Beograd to fellow Serbian SuperLiga club Rad.

Red Star Belgrade
In August 2010, Kaluđerović signed a three-year contract with Red Star Belgrade. He was the league's joint top scorer in the 2010–11 season, alongside Ivica Iliev, with 13 goals. In February 2012, Kaluđerović was transferred to Chinese Super League club Beijing Guoan for an undisclosed fee.

In July 2013, Kaluđerović returned to Serbia and joined Vojvodina on a season-long loan. His loan was later transferred to Cypriot club AEL Limassol in January 2014.

Brisbane Roar
On 29 January 2015, Brisbane Roar announced that they had acquired the services of the Serbian for the remainder of the 2014–15 A-League, with an option to an extension at the end of the season. Upon his arrival to the club, Kaluđerović said that it had been a desire of his to play in Australia for the Roar since facing them in the 2012 AFC Champions League, then with Beijing Guoan. He scored his first goal on his debut for the side in a 2–0 win over Central Coast Mariners. On 30 May 2015, Kaluđerović was released by new manager John Aloisi as his contract expired.

Wellington Phoenix
On 15 August 2017, it was announced that Kaluđerović would be returning to the A-League to play for the Wellington Phoenix on a one-year deal. He was the team's top scorer in the 2017–18 season with nine goals.

Olimpija Ljubljana
In June 2018, Kaluđerović joined Slovenian champions Olimpija Ljubljana, signing a two-year deal. He, however, spent just two months at the club, failing to make his official debut.

Delhi Dynamos
In August 2018, Kaluđerović signed with Indian Super League club Delhi Dynamos.

Inter Zaprešić
In January 2019, Kaluđerović signed with Croatian club Inter Zaprešić. In an interview, Kaludjerovic said that "The quality of the players [in the Croatian league] is similar, but they have a stronger league. They are much more organized, the pitches are better, they respect the payments of players, they have equalized the status of domestic and foreign, there are no rigged matches, rigged refereeing, all matches are broadcast on television".

International career
In UEFA competitions, Kaluđerović was capped for Serbia and Montenegro at under-19 level and Serbia at under-21 level. He was subsequently selected to represent Serbia at the 2008 Summer Olympics, but failed to make any appearances.

In April 2010, Kaluđerović made his full international debut for Serbia in a friendly match against Japan. He received his second call-up to the team for two friendlies against Mexico and Honduras in November 2011, appearing in both games.

Personal life
In January 2010, Kaluđerović married TV host Milica Stanišić.

Career statistics

Club

International

Honours
OFK Beograd
 Serbia and Montenegro Cup: runner-up 2005–06

Žalgiris
 A Lyga: 2016
 Lithuanian Cup: 2016

Nasaf
 AFC Cup: runner-up 2021

Individual
 Serbian SuperLiga top scorer: 2010–11
 Serbian SuperLiga Team of the Season: 2010–11
 A Lyga top scorer: 2016

Notes

References

External links

 
 
 
 
 

1987 births
Living people
People from Bačka Topola
Serbia and Montenegro footballers
Serbia under-21 international footballers
Serbia international footballers
Serbian expatriate footballers
Association football forwards
A Lyga players
A-League Men players
AEL Limassol players
Al-Shahania SC players
Beijing Guoan F.C. players
Brisbane Roar FC players
Chinese Super League players
Cypriot First Division players
Expatriate association footballers in New Zealand
Expatriate soccer players in Australia
Expatriate footballers in China
Expatriate footballers in Croatia
Expatriate footballers in Cyprus
Expatriate footballers in India
Expatriate footballers in Lithuania
Expatriate footballers in Qatar
Expatriate footballers in Slovenia
Expatriate footballers in Spain
Expatriate footballers in Switzerland
Expatriate footballers in Thailand
Expatriate footballers in Latvia
FC Thun players
First League of Serbia and Montenegro players
FK Hajduk Beograd players
FK Mačva Šabac players
FK Rad players
FK Radnički Pirot players
FK Spartak Subotica players
FK Vojvodina players
FK Žalgiris players
Footballers at the 2008 Summer Olympics
Indian Super League players
Wellington Phoenix FC players
NK Olimpija Ljubljana (2005) players
NK Inter Zaprešić players
Odisha FC players
OFK Beograd players
Olympic footballers of Serbia
Andrija Kaluđerovic
FK RFS players
Racing de Santander players
Red Star Belgrade footballers
Segunda División players
Serbian expatriate sportspeople in Australia
Serbian expatriate sportspeople in China
Serbian expatriate sportspeople in Croatia
Serbian expatriate sportspeople in Cyprus
Serbian expatriate sportspeople in India
Serbian expatriate sportspeople in Lithuania
Serbian expatriate sportspeople in Qatar
Serbian expatriate sportspeople in Slovenia
Serbian expatriate sportspeople in Spain
Serbian expatriate sportspeople in Switzerland
Serbian expatriate sportspeople in Thailand
Serbian expatriate sportspeople in Latvia
Serbian First League players
Serbian footballers
Serbian SuperLiga players
Swiss Super League players
Andrija Kaluđerovic
Latvian Higher League players